Bodianus oxycephalus is a species of wrasse. It is found in the Northwestern Pacific Ocean.

Size

References

Fish of the Pacific Ocean
oxycephalus
Taxa named by Pieter Bleeker
Fish described in 1862